Voss (also as Voß in German, meaning fox in Low German) is a surname. Notable people with the surname include:
 Alain Voss, Franco-Brazilian comics artist
 Andreas Voss (disambiguation)
 Andrew Voss (born 1960), Australian television sports presenter
 Arno Voss (1821–1888), American politician
 Barbara Voss (born 1967), American historical archaeologist
 Brandon Voss (born 1978), American journalist
 Brett Voss (born 1978), Australian football player, younger brother of Michael
 Brian Voss (born 1958), professional bowler and a member of both the PBA and USBC Hall of Fame
 Carl Voss (ice hockey player) (1907–1993)
 Christopher Voss (born 1957), American FBI hostage negotiator
 Catalin Voss (born 1995), German inventor and entrepreneur
 Edward Groesbeck Voss, (1929–2012), American botanist and lepidopterist
 Ernst Voss (1842–1920), German shipbuilder and co-company founder of German company Blohm+Voss
 Gerhard Johann Vossius (Voss) (1577–1649), Dutch classical scholar and theologian
 Gilbert L. Voss (1918–1989), American conservationist and oceanographer
 Gordon Voss (1938–2017), American politician
 Hans-Erich Voss (1897–1969), German Vice Admiral during World War II
 Johann Esch and Heinrich Voes (died 1523), one of the first two Lutheran martyrs
 Holger Voss, German internet user who was sued for a sarcastic comment he made about the September 11, 2001 terrorist attacks 
 Isaac Voss (1618–1689), youngest son of Gerhard J. Voss  
 James S. Voss (born 1949), American astronaut
 Janice E. Voss (1956–2012), American astronaut
 Joan Voss (born 1940), American politician
 Johann Heinrich Voss (1751–1826), German poet and translator
 John Voss (1858–1922), Canadian sea captain and sailor
 Julia Voss (born 1974), German journalist
 Julius von Voss (1768–1832), German writer
 Kurt Voss (born 1963), American film director
 Michael Voss (born 1975), Australian footballer and coach, brother of Brett
 Paul Voss (born 1986), German road racing cyclist
 Paul K. Voss (1973-2020), U.S. Air Force pilot 
 Peter Voss (born 1897), German SS non-commissioned officer and commander of the Auschwitz crematoria and gas chambers
 Richard Voss (1851–1918), German dramatist and novelist
 Richard Voss (1880–1948), English cricketer
 Torsten Voss (born 1963), German athlete
 Victor Voss (1868–1936), German tennis player
 Vida de Voss, Namibian feminist activist
 Werner Voss (1897–1917), German fighter pilot
 Wolfgard Voß (1926–2020), German gymnast

See also 
 Voss (disambiguation)
 Vos (surname)
 Vossstrasse, a street in Berlin
 Blohm + Voss, shipbuilding
 Die Sehnsucht der Veronika Voss, German movie of 1982
 Voss (novel) by Patrick White
 Foss (disambiguation)

References

German-language surnames
Low German surnames
Surnames from nicknames